Retribution is the sixth studio album by American heavy metal band Shadows Fall. The album was released on September 15, 2009. It debuted at number 35 on the Billboard 200. The album would produce singles for "Still I Rise" and for their cover of  Ozzy Osbourne's "Bark at the Moon". The song "War" is an original composition but uses lyrics from the Bob Marley & the Wailers song War.

Track listing

Bonus DVD (Deluxe Edition)

Live songs
Live from Bonnaroo (Music & Arts Festival)
Failure of the Devout
A Public Execution
Thoughts Without Words
Live at The Crazy Donkey
The Power of I and I
Forevermore

Instructional videos
Guitar World
King of Nothing
Still I Rise
Tip: Alternate Picking
Tip: Downstroke
Tip: Leads
Tip: Vibrato
Drum Lesson
Still I Rise

Personnel
Shadows Fall
Brian Fair – lead vocals
Jon Donais – lead guitar, backing vocals
Matt Bachand – rhythm guitar, clean vocals
Paul Romanko – bass
Jason Bittner – drums

Additional performer
Randy Blythe – guest vocals on "King of Nothing"

Production
Produced by Zeuss and Shadows Fall
Engineered and mixed by Zeuss
Mastered by Alan Douches
Vocals produced by Michael (Elvis) Baskette and engineered by Dave Holdredge
Artwork and layout by Sons of Nero
Photography by Jeremy Saffer

References

External links
 Official website

2009 albums
Shadows Fall albums
Albums produced by Chris "Zeuss" Harris